Matthew "Matt" Fuerbringer (born January 29, 1974) is an American beach volleyball player. Throughout his AVP career, he has teamed up with Casey Jennings.

Biography
Fuerbringer was born in Costa Mesa, California. He attended Estancia High School. He received a degree in American Studies at Stanford University. Fuerbringer currently lives in Redondo Beach, California with his wife Joy McKenzie, who is a former All-American at Long Beach State and owns the Mizuno Long Beach Volleyball Club. He also owns his own volleyball club called Rockstar. They have a daughter, Charlie, born in 2006 as well as a son, Mateo, born in 2009. He has spent five years playing professional volleyball in Europe and became fluent in Spanish. At his years at Stanford, Fuerbringer was named four-time All-American, Freshman of the Year, Outstanding Senior Athlete and was a member of the 1997 NCAA National Championship team. Fuerbringer remains as Stanford's leader in kills, and also ranks in the top five in aces and blocks.

As of April 1, 2013, Fuerbringer is an assistant coach for the U.S. Men's National Volleyball Team.

References

External links
 
 
 
 Matt Fuerbringer Volleyball Videos

1974 births
Living people
People from Costa Mesa, California
American men's beach volleyball players
Stanford Cardinal men's volleyball players
Sportspeople from Redondo Beach, California
American volleyball coaches